The 1949 North Dakota Fighting Sioux football team, also known as the Nodaks, was an American football team that represented the University of North Dakota in the North Central Conference (NCC) during the 1949 college football season. In its first and only year under head coach Dick Miller, the team compiled a 4–3–1 record (3–2–1 against NCC opponents), tied for third place out of seven teams in the NCC, and was outscored by a total of 121 to 72. The team played its home games at Memorial Stadium in Grand Forks, North Dakota.

Schedule

References

North Dakota
North Dakota Fighting Hawks football seasons
North Dakota Fighting Sioux football